The Deacon Daniel Green House is a historic house at 747 Main Street in Wakefield, Massachusetts.  It is a -story wood-frame house, with a gable roof and clapboard siding.  It was built early in the Federal period (1750-1785), and is one of a few surviving examples of a local architectural variant, three bays wide and four bays deep.  The house was occupied by Deacon Daniel Green in 1785, who moved to South Reading (as Wakefield was then known), from Stoneham.

The house was listed on the National Register of Historic Places in 1989.

See also
National Register of Historic Places listings in Wakefield, Massachusetts
National Register of Historic Places listings in Middlesex County, Massachusetts

References

Houses on the National Register of Historic Places in Wakefield, Massachusetts
Federal architecture in Massachusetts
Houses in Wakefield, Massachusetts